Joanna Grisez (born 5 October 1996) is a French rugby union, and rugby sevens player. She was selected as a member of the France women's national rugby sevens team to the  2020 Summer Olympics. She won a bronze medal at the 2022 Rugby World Cup Sevens.

Grisez was named in France's fifteens team for the 2021 Rugby World Cup in New Zealand.

References 

Living people
1996 births
French rugby sevens players
France international women's rugby sevens players